Hayy Ur is a neighborhood of Baghdad, Iraq.

See also
Sha'ab, Baghdad

Ur